is a passenger railway station located in the city of Yamato, Kanagawa, Japan and operated by the private railway operator Sagami Railway (Sotetsu). The station is convenient for many American servicemembers stationed at the Naval Air Facility Atsugi.

Lines

Station layout
The station consists of an island platform connected to an elevated station building located above the platforms and tracks.

Platforms

Adjacent stations

History
Sagami-Ōtsuka Station was opened on May 12, 1926 as a station of the Jinchū Railway. It was relocated to its present location in 1943

Passenger statistics
In fiscal 2019, the station was used by an average of 14,283 passengers daily..

The passenger figures for previous years are as shown below.

Surrounding area
Japan National Route 246
 Naval Air Facility Atsugi.
 Tomei Expressway

See also
 List of railway stations in Japan

References

External links

official home page.

Railway stations in Kanagawa Prefecture
Railway stations in Japan opened in 1926
Railway stations in Yamato, Kanagawa